Beiuș is a city in Bihor County, Romania near the Apuseni Mountains. The river Crișul Negru flows through Beiuș, and the city administers a single village, Delani (Gyalány).

Between the late 18th and very early 20th centuries, Beiuș constituted one of the most important learning centres of the Romanian language in Crișana.

Demographics

According to the 2011 Census, Beiuș has a population of 10,667 inhabitants.

The ethnic structure of the population is:
 Romanian  89.8%
 Hungarian  7.3%
 Roma  2.6%
 Other 0.3%

History
Beiuș's earliest mention in recorded history was in the year 1263, where it was mentioned as being burned down during a Mongol invasion in 1241. After some Ottoman occupation,  it was conquered in 1691 by the Habsburg empire as confirmed by the Treaty of Karlowitz in 1699. After the Austro-Hungarian Compromise of 1867 it was ruled by the Hungarian administration, until the Great Romanian Union in 1918.

Timeline
 Estate of the Oradea Bishopric is mentioned for the first time in the Regestrum Varadiensis. It was mentioned under Benenus in 1291, Belinis in 1300 and Benenes in 1309.
 1451 Became a royal free city under John Vitez of Zredna.
 Seal of Beiuș showing Ladislaus I of Hungary inscribed around: "Sigillum Oppidi Belenes"
 1552 Oradea Bishopric tithe list counts more than 420 settlement houses.
 1570 Under the Speyer Agreement, the Prince of Transylvania ruled this region.
 1660 The Ottoman Empire conquered Beiuș.
 1691 The Habsburg Empire conquered Beiuș.
 1692 A census mentions 9 Hungarian families.
 1715 A census mentions 29 Hungarian families.
 1720 52 Hungarian families and 22 Romanian families lived in the city.
 1754 A Romanian secondary school opens, the second in Transylvania after the one at Blaj.
 1777 Maria Theresa of Austria founded Greek Catholic Bishopric with the residence in Oradea and endowed the Bishopric with an estate in Beiuș.
 Bishop Ignațiu Darabant (1738-1805) erected the Greek Catholic Church of Saint Demetrius
 Bishop Samuil Vulcan (1806–1893) set up the Greek-Catholic secondary school in Beiuș and endowed it with everything necessary.
 1850 1250 Romanian and 950 Hungarian families lived in the city.
 1914 2134 Hungarians and 1974 Romanians lived in Beiuș.
 2002 Around 9,800 Romanians and around 900 Hungarians live in Beiuș.

Places to see

Today, Beiuș is a peaceful place, combining few ethnicities and three times as many religions as in previous times. The city contains superb architectural edifices, including a few old churches and the "Samuil Vulcan" highschool, built in 1828, which obtained the "National College" designation in 1998. The city is a key point in reaching the Apuseni Mountains and their rich mines, or mountain resorts like Stâna de Vale or Arieșeni through smaller but picturesque communities and villages like Budureasa or Vascău. The nearby mountains are hosts to some of the most dense and spectacular limestone cave systems in the world. These caves contain remains of the extinct cave bear (Ursus speleus) and prehistoric humans, huge colonies of bats, subterranean lakes, striking calcareous formations and giant earthworms that live in the guano-flooded cave floor.

Beiuș has its own city museum which houses over 3,000 pieces. The museum exhibits reflect its natural history, military history and art, but most famous are its folkloric artifacts: peasant tools, pottery, garments and folk art gathered from the entire central and southern county of Bihor. The tunnels in the city are also famous, as they are believed to link together and act as escape routes used during the Medieval Age. Their construction began during the rule of Hungarian king Bela IV. The nearby landscape includes: agricultural hills with crops ranging from corn, wheat and potato to fruit orchards like apple, pears, plums and strawberries. A long stretch of wildlife depleted forest that is rich in flora begins in the north-east of the city. Industry is represented mainly through production of furniture and fashion destined for European markets. The nearby distillery and beverage factory of Sudrigiu also employs a large part of the city's labour force.

Available or popular sports in or around Beiuș are: fresh water fishing (trout, catfish, carp, barbel chub dace and at least a dozen other edible species), speleology (spelunking), soccer (Sunday soccer is a local ritual for all ages), skiing, snowboarding, sledding, tennis, hiking, camping, backpacking and rock climbing. Hunting for species like: wild boar, roe deer, rabbit, pheasant, dove, partridge or ducks (mainly mallards) is also popular.

Sports
Football is the most successful and loved sport in Beiuș, Bihorul Beiuș being the most representative team of the city, a club with a rather rich history, being founded in 1921.

Notable people
Cosmin Bodea, football player and manager
Edward Clug, ballet dancer and choreographer
Josef Dande, landscape artist
Remus Ganea, footballer 
Adrian Pintea, actor
Gheorghe Solomie, rugby player

Twin towns – sister cities

Beiuș is twinned with:
 Békéscsaba, Hungary
 Green, United States
 Komló, Hungary
 Méhkerék, Hungary

References

 
Populated places in Bihor County
Localities in Crișana
Cities in Romania